Pediasia fascelinella is a species of moth of the family Crambidae. It was described by Jacob Hübner in 1813 and is found in Europe.

The wingspan is 24–30 mm. The moth flies from July to August depending on the location.

The larvae feed on various grasses.

External links

 Waarneming.nl  
 Lepidoptera of Belgium
 Pediasia fascelinella at UKMoths

Crambini
Moths of Europe
Moths described in 1813